Shallow breathing,  thoracic breathing, costal breathing or chest breathing  is the drawing of minimal breath into the lungs, usually by drawing air into the chest area using the intercostal muscles rather than throughout the lungs via the diaphragm. Shallow breathing can result in or be symptomatic of rapid breathing and hypoventilation. Most people who breathe shallowly do it throughout the day and they are almost always unaware of the condition.

In upper lobar breathing, clavicular breathing, or clavicle breathing, air is drawn predominantly into the chest by the raising of the shoulders and collarbone (clavicles), and simultaneous contracting of the abdomen during inhalation. A maximum amount of air can be drawn this way only for short periods of time, since it requires persistent effort.

Conditions
Several conditions are marked by, or are symptomatic of, shallow breathing. The more common of these conditions include: various anxiety disorders, asthma, hyperventilation, pneumonia, pulmonary edema, and shock. Anxiety, stress, and panic attacks often accompany shallow breathing.

Overly shallow breathing, also known medically as hypopnea, may result in hypoventilation, which could cause a build up of carbon dioxide in an individual's body, a symptom known as hypercapnia. It's a condition related to neuro-muscular disorders (NMDs) that include Lou Gehrig's disease, muscular dystrophy, polio, post-polio syndrome and others. It is a serious condition if not diagnosed properly, or if it's ignored. It is often treated as a "sleep disorder" after a sleep study performed, but "sleep studies cannot diagnose shallow breathing (JR Bach, M.D.)." Serious symptoms arise most commonly during sleep, because when the body sleeps, the intercostal muscles do not perform the breathing action, so it's done by the diaphragm, which is often impaired in people with NMDs.

Very often, after a sleep study, when someone has been unsuccessfully using positive airway pressure (PAP) ventilation, they are prescribed nasal oxygen at night; this should never be used without clear evidence of oxygen saturation of 94% or less; the non-judicious use of oxygen (which is a prescribed drug) may cause brain damage.

Additionally, polio survivors with breathing conditions and others with NMDs may be given a tracheostomy (a surgical opening for breathing made in the neck). Any one with symptoms arising during sleep must seek out specialists in neuro-muscular breathing conditions.

The test to determine shallow breathing is simple and can be carried out at the bedside by a knowledgeable, licensed, respiratory therapist.

See also

Diaphragmatic breathing
Rapid shallow breathing index
Thoracic cavity

References

Further reading
Bach, J.R. (1999). Guide to the evaluation and management of neuromuscular disease. Philadelphia, PA: Hanley & Belfus.
Gay, PC., & Edmonds, L.C. (1995). Severe hypercapnia after low-flow oxygen therapy in patients with neuromuscular disease and diaphragmatic dysfunction. Mayo Clinic Proceedings, 70(4), 327–330.
Hsu, A., & Staats, B. (1998). "Postpolio" sequelae and sleep-related disordered breathing. Mayo Clinic Proceedings, 73, 216–224.
Krachman, S., & Criner, G.J. (1998). Hypoventilation syndromes. Clinics in Chest Medicine, 19(l),139-155.

Breathing abnormalities
Sleep disorders